Sphaeniscus melanotrichotus is a species of tephritid or fruit flies in the genus Sphaeniscus of the family Tephritidae.

Distribution
Sri Lanka.

References

Tephritinae
Insects described in 1956
Diptera of Asia